Pardus is a Linux distribution developed with support from the government of Turkey. Pardus' main focus is office-related work including use in Turkish government agencies. Despite that, Pardus ships in several languages. Its ease of use and availability free of charge has spawned numerous communities throughout the world.

Development 
Pardus was started by Turkish National Research Institute of Electronics and Cryptology (UEKAE), a division of the Scientific and Technological Research Council of Turkey (TÜBİTAK), in 2003.

The first live CD version of Pardus was a fork of Gentoo Linux in 2005. The current version is a fork of Debian.

Release history

PiSi package management 
PiSi (Packages Installed Successfully as Intended; also a Turkish word meaning "kitty", intended as a pun on the distribution's name, which is derived from pardus, the species name of the leopard.) is a package management system that was developed for Pardus. It was used in the initial versions of the distribution, but abandoned in favor of APT since the project moved to Debian base. Pardus 2011.2, released on September 19, 2011, was the last Pardus release that used PiSi.

PiSi stores and handles dependencies for various packages, libraries, and COMAR tasks. Some features of PiSi include:

 Uses the LZMA compression algorithm
 Written in Python
 Package sources are written in XML and Python
 Database access implemented with Berkeley DB
 Integrates low-level and high-level package operations (dependency resolution)
 Framework approach to build applications and tools upon

A community fork of the old Pardus with PiSi package management exists, called PiSi Linux. PiSi Linux's latest stable version is 1.2, and latest development version is 2.0 Beta 2.

eopkg - the package manager of the Solus project, a rolling-release Linux distribution, is based on / derived from PiSi.

YALI 
YALI (Yet Another Linux Installer) is the first Pardus software a user encounters. Basically, it recognizes the hardware and installs Pardus software from installation media (i.e. CD) to a user-selected hard disk partition. YALI can handle resizing of NTFS partitions found on the disk. A yalı is a waterside mansion common in the Bosphorus region.

This project is stopped and not being used since the migration to Debian-base.

KAPTAN 
KAPTAN is a desktop greeter, which starts at the first start. It allows a user to change the desktop theme, mouse, keyboard and language settings, date and time, KDE menus, wallpaper, Package Manager settings, smolt, number of desktops. The word Kaptan means 'captain' in Turkish.

This project is stopped and not being used since the migration to Debian-base.

Reception 
Ladislav Bodnar, the creator of DistroWatch, wrote in his round-up of Linux/*nix in 2006 that Pardus is one of the distros he was most impressed by that year "... thanks to unique package management ideas, innovative start-up sequence and general desktop polish ..."

Dmitri Popov, an author of Linux User & Developer, titled his review of Pardus 2011 Beta as the most exciting distro of the year.

Social events and participation 
 Pardus participated in Google Summer of Code 2008 and 2009.
 Pardus attended CeBIT Eurasia in 2006, 2008, 2009, 2010, and 2011.

Derivatives 
Pardus Community Edition based on Debian released on April 12, 2013.

Pisi Linux and Pardus-Anka projects forked from PiSi based Pardus. A group of volunteers aim to continue PiSi and other features of Pardus independently.

Pisi Linux released two new versions. These versions are direct continuation of Pardus 2011.2 64bit edition, includes updated versions of Pisi, Kaptan etc.

Usage 
 Turkish Armed Forces (partially)
 Ministry of Foreign Affairs (Turkey) (partially)
 Ministry of National Defence (Turkey)
 Turkish Police (partially)
 Social Security Institution (migrating)
 Schools (partially)

References

External links

PardusWiki – Multilingual resources
PiSi Linux's website
Pardus in OpenSourceFeed Gallery

Debian-based distributions
KDE
Science and technology in Turkey
Scientific and Technological Research Council of Turkey
State-sponsored Linux distributions
Turkish inventions
Turkish-language Linux distributions
Linux distributions